The Dwelling Place of Light is a 1920 American silent drama film directed by Jack Conway and starring Claire Adams, Nigel De Brulier and King Baggot. It is based on the 1917 novel The Dwelling-Place of Light by the American novelist Winston Churchill.

Cast
 Claire Adams as Janet Butler 
 Nigel De Brulier as James Rolfe 
 King Baggot as Brooks Insall 
 Robert McKim as Claude Ditmar 
 Ogden Crane as Chester Sprole 
 Lassie Young as Elsie Butler 
 Lydia Knott as Hannah Butler 
 George Berrell as Edward Butler 
 Beulah Booker as Julia Gallagher 
 William V. Mong as John Gallager 
 Aggie Herring as Mrs. Gallagher 
 Charles Murphy as Guido Antonelli

References

Bibliography
 James Robert Parish & Michael R. Pitts. Film directors: a guide to their American films. Scarecrow Press, 1974.

External links
 

1920 films
1920 drama films
1920s English-language films
American silent feature films
Silent American drama films
Films directed by Jack Conway
American black-and-white films
Pathé Exchange films
Films distributed by W. W. Hodkinson Corporation
1920s American films